Georgy Fedorovich Morozov (7 January 1867 – 9 May 1920) was an Imperial forester and biologist in the Russian Empire who introduced the first ecological ideas to classify forest types. He introduced ideas of "the forest as a plant society" which he developed into the definition of the forest as a complex biogeocenotic, geographic, and historical phenomenon made up of non-living and living components.

Biography 
Morozov was born in St. Petersburg, Russia where his father worked in a linen drapery. He went to the military academy at Pavlovsk and graduated in 1886 as a second lieutenant. When posted into Latvia, he met several students including the exiled revolutionary Olga Zandrok. After her period of exile ended, he left the army, moved back to St. Petersburg along with Olga and began to study the agricultural sciences at the Institute of Forestry. Morozov's father disowned him and he was left to earn his own living by teaching while also studying. He studied botany under I.P. Borodin and was influenced by the soil scientist P.A. Kostichev, the zoologist N.A. Kholodkovsky and at the Zandrok household, by the anatomist and family friend Peter Lesgaft. Lesgaft had been dismissed from St. Petersburg University for his political views but he gave private lessons in anatomy, and Morozov attended them. This gave him a firm founding in evolution and comparative anatomy. He graduated in 1893 and was grief stricken when Olga Zandrok died from diphtheria. He later married Olga's sister Lidia Nikolaevna.

 He worked as a forester in the Khrenovk forest preserve in Voronezh gubernia. In 1896 he was sent to study forest management in Germany and Switzerland and spent time at the Eberswalde Academy with Professor Adam Friedrich Schwappach. On his return he was posted to the Voronezh province to examine afforestation measures. This forest had been planned by the soil scientist Vasily Dokuchaev to manage droughts. Here he examined the growth of pine and wrote his first work. In 1899 he wrote a work on forests and soils after examining Dokuchaev's works. He worked with Dokuchaev as well as G. I. Tanfilyev. In 1901 he was posted as professor of forestry at St. Petersburg. Morozov introduced the term "silvics" and considered the forest to be a connected and complex system rather than a mere collection of trees. He examined the development of forests, plant succession, and on harvesting practices. He was also involved in higher education. In 1917, he suffered poor health and moved to Yalta. In 1918 he took up a position at the new university in Simferopol where he died about two years later.

References

External links 
 Почвоведение и лесоводство [Soil and Forestry] (1899)
 Содержание и задачи общего лесоводства [The objectives of general forestry] (1904)

1867 births
1920 deaths
Foresters from the Russian Empire
Ecologists from the Russian Empire
People from Saint Petersburg